The Reorganized Social Democratic Party of Hungary was a political party in Hungary. It was founded in 1900 by Vilmos Mezőfi. Mezőfi, a journalist by profession, had been expelled from the Social Democratic Party of Hungary for being outspoken on agrarian issues. Mezőfi's party advocated land reforms, and forced sales of large estates of land.

References

Political parties in Austria-Hungary
Political parties established in 1900
1900 establishments in Hungary
Social democratic parties in Hungary